Drosanthus is a genus of tephritid or fruit fly in the family Tephritidae.

References

Trypetinae
Tephritidae genera